Tullamareena (or Tullamarine, Dullamarin)  was a senior man of the Wurundjeri, a Koori, (Aboriginal) people of the Melbourne area, at the time of the  British settlement in Victoria, Australia, in 1835. He is believed to have been present at the signing of John Batman's land deal in 1835. He was known to have been a resistor to British occupation of Wurundjeri lands. He was described by the Reverend George Langhorne, an early Port Phillip missionary as "a steady, industrious man".

On 25 April 1838, Tullamareena was arrested for stealing potatoes from John Gardiner's property in Hawthorn. During his imprisonment he escaped and as a consequence burnt down the first Melbourne gaol along with his friends Moonee Moonee and Jin Jin.
William Lonsdale, the first Police magistrate of Melbourne wrote in a letter to the colonial secretary on 26 April 1838:

...I was at first apprehensive that some of the blacks had set the gaol on fire...for the purpose of liberating the three who were confined, but to ascertain what I could on this point, I went as soon as I was satisfied that the stores and prisoners were temporarily disposed of after their being taken from the buildings, into the different camps of blacks, of which there were three in the neighbourhood... Describing how the gaol was set fire to, he says that the other black who was confined with him got a long piece of reed which he thrust through an opening in the partition between the place where he was confined in and the guard room, and after lighting the reed by the guard's candle he drew it back and set fire to the thatch roof. The two blacks got off but one was afterwards retaken, viz. Jin Jin. This affair is much to be regretted, keeping up as it undoubtedly will the public alarm and agitation regarding the blacks.

Tullamareena was later recaptured and sent for trial in Sydney by ship. His trial was terminated when it was established he was unable to understand English. He was set free more than 700 km from his home and no records indicate further colonial contact.
It is told in Sunbury that upon release he walked back all the way home - to the region around Tullamarine and placed a spell on the land near Tullamarine Airport.

He has a Melbourne suburb, its airport and the freeway named after him.

References

The Birth of Melbourne, edited and introduced by Tim Flannery 2002. Text Publishing Co. Melbourne

History of Indigenous Australians
History of Melbourne
Wurundjeri people